Radibor (German) or Radwor (Upper Sorbian) is a municipality in Saxony in Germany. It is situated in Upper Lusatia about 10 km north of Bautzen, which is also the main city of the District of Bautzen to which Radibor belongs.

Radibor was first mentioned in a written source in 1359. Its name is of Sorbian origin and generally means "place of the council". The municipality belongs to the central settlement area of the Sorbs.

Following villages belong to the municipality of Radibor (names given in German/Upper Sorbian, followed by the number of inhabitants):
Bornitz/Boranecy, 125 inh.
Brohna/Bronjo, 73 inh.
Camina/Kamjenej, 119 inh.
Cölln/Chelno, 356 inh.
Droben/Droby, 89 inh.
Großbrösern/Wulki Přezdrěń, 46 inh.
Lippitsch/Lipič, 193 inh.
Lomske/Łomsk, 205 inh.
Luppa/Łupoj, 205 inh.
Luppedubrau/Łupjanska Dubrawka, 79 inh.
Luttowitz/Lutobč, 162 inh.
Merka/Měrkow, 139 inh.
Milkel/Minakał, 420 inh.
Milkwitz/Miłkecy, 113 inh.
Neu-Bornitz/Nowe Boranecy, 61 inh.
Neu-Brohna/Nowe Bronjo, 20 inh.
Quoos/Chasow, 156 inh.
Radibor/Radwor, 704 inh.
Schwarzadler/Čorny Hodler, 37 inh.
Teicha/Hat, 75 inh.
Wessel/Wjesel, 99 inh.

People 
 Wolf Heinrich von Baudissin (1549–1646), Prussian field marshal during the Thirty Years' War

References 

Populated places in Bautzen (district)